Johannes Schneider, O.F.M. (died 1551) was a Roman Catholic prelate who served as Auxiliary Bishop of Paderborn (1507–1551).

Biography
Johannes Schneider ordained a priest in the Order of Friars Minor.
On 19 Apr 1507, he was appointed during the papacy of Pope Julius II as Auxiliary Bishop of Paderborn and Titular Bishop of Tiflis.
On 30 May 1507, he was consecrated bishop.
He served as Auxiliary Bishop of Paderborn until his death on 27 Mar 1551.

References

Additional references
 Johannes Schneider. In: Ralf Michael Nickel: Zwischen Stadt, Territorium und Kirche: Franziskus’ Söhne in Westfalen bis zum Beginn des Dreißigjährigen Krieges. Dissertation, Universität Bochum 2007,  S. 117 (online, PDF; 7,6 MB).

16th-century German Roman Catholic bishops
Bishops appointed by Pope Julius II
1551 deaths
Franciscan bishops